Cyril Manners Roger (27 December 1921 - 26 May 2015) was a former international motorcycle speedway rider reached the final of Speedway World Championship five times.

Career
Roger started his career with the Exeter Falcons in 1947 on loan from the New Cross Rangers. Until July 1948 he was part of the Falcons team that won the National League Division Three Championship, but was recalled by New Cross. He featured in ten outings for New Cross, and received a medal when they won the National League Division One title in the same season.

In 1949 he joined the Rangers full-time and qualified for the first of his five World Final appearances. In 1950 Roger won the prestigious London Riders' Championship and made his debut for England.

Roger stayed with New Cross until 1953, making two further World Final appearances in the meantime, before joining the Norwich Stars when the Rangers closed. A season with the Poole Pirates in 1956 was followed with a season with the Ipswich Witches where he broke his leg.

Roger returned to racing in 1959 with the Norwich Stars where he stayed for two seasons before finishing his career after three seasons with the Southampton Saints in 1963.

World final appearances
 1949 -  London, Wembley Stadium - 10th - 7pts
 1950 -  London, Wembley Stadium - Res - 5pts
 1952 -  London, Wembley Stadium - 15th - 2pts
 1955 -  London, Wembley Stadium - 16th - 0pts
 1959 -  London, Wembley Stadium - 16th - 0pts

Family
His brothers Bob Roger and Bert Roger were both speedway riders.

References

1921 births
2015 deaths
British speedway riders
English motorcycle racers
New Cross Rangers riders
Exeter Falcons riders
Norwich Stars riders
Ipswich Witches riders
Poole Pirates riders
Southampton Saints riders
People from Ashford, Kent